This is a list of topics related to the Central African Republic.

Buildings and structures in the Central African Republic

Airports in the Central African Republic
 Bangui M'Poko International Airport

Sports venues in the Central African Republic

Football venues in the Central African Republic
 Barthélemy Boganda Stadium

Communications in the Central African Republic
 AfricaPhonebook/Annulaires Afrique
 Communications in the Central African Republic
 .cf
 List of people on stamps of Central African Republic
 Socatel

Central African culture
 Coat of arms of the Central African Republic
 Flag of the Central African Republic
 La Renaissance
 Public holidays in the Central African Republic

Central African music
 Music of the Central African Republic

Gabonese music
 Music of Gabon

Gabonese musicians
 Pierre Akendengué
 Patience Dabany
 Oliver N'Goma

Languages of the Central African Republic
 Aja language
 Fer language
 Gbaya language
 Makaa–Njem languages
 Sango language

Sport in the Central African Republic

Football in the Central African Republic

 Central African Republic national football team
 Central African Football Federation

Central African Republic at the Olympics
 Central African Republic at the 1992 Summer Olympics
 Central African Republic at the 1996 Summer Olympics
 Central African Republic at the 2000 Summer Olympics
 Central African Republic at the 2004 Summer Olympics
 Central African Republic at the 2008 Summer Olympics

Economy of the Central African Republic
 Economy of the Central African Republic

Companies of the Central African Republic
 Socatel

Trade unions of the Central African Republic
 Confédération Syndicale des Travailleurs de Centrafrique
 National Confederation of Central African Workers
 Union of Central African Workers

Education in the Central African Republic
 University of Bangui

Universities and colleges in the Central African Republic
 University of Bangui

Geography of the Central African Republic
 Geography of the Central African Republic
 Adamawa Plateau
 Demographics of the Central African Republic
 Manovo-Gounda St. Floris National Park
 Tondou Massif

Cities in the Central African Republic
 List of cities in the Central African Republic
 Abiras
 Alindao
 Bambari
 Bangassou
 Bangui
 Baoro
 Batangafo
 Berbérati
 Bimbo, Central African Republic
 Birao
 Boali
 Boda
 Bossangoa
 Bossembélé
 Bouar
 Bouca
 Bozoum
 Bria
 Carnot, Central African Republic
 Damara, Central African Republic
 Gambo, Central African Republic
 Gamboula
 Ippy
 Kabo
 Kaga-Bandoro
 Kembé
 Kouango
 Mbaïki
 Mobaye
 Mongoumba
 N'Délé
 Nola, Central African Republic
 Obo
 Ouadda
 Ouango
 Paoua
 Rafaï
 Sibut
 Zinga

Prefectures of the Central African Republic
 Prefectures of the Central African Republic
 Bamingui-Bangoran
 Basse-Kotto
 Haut-Mbomou
 Haute-Kotto
 Kemo-Gribingui
 Kémo
 Lobaye
 Mambéré-Kadéï
 Mbomou
 Nana-Grébizi
 Nana-Mambéré
 Ombella-M'Poko
 Ouaka
 Ouham
 Ouham-Pendé
 Sangha-Mbaéré
 Vakaga

Rivers of the Central African Republic
 Chari River
 Kadéï River
 Mbomou River
 Ouham River
 Sangha River
 Ubangi River

Central African Republic geography stubs
 Abiras
 Adamawa Plateau
 Alindao
 Bambari
 Bamingui-Bangoran
 Bangassou
 Baoro
 Basse-Kotto
 Batangafo
 Berbérati
 Bimbo, Central African Republic
 Birao
 Boali
 Boda
 Bossangoa
 Bossembélé
 Bouar
 Bouca
 Bozoum
 Bria
 Carnot, Central African Republic
 Chari River
 Damara, Central African Republic
 Gambo, Central African Republic
 Gamboula
 Haut-Mbomou
 Haute-Kotto
 Ippy
 Kabo
 Kaga-Bandoro
 Kembé
 Kemo-Gribingui
 Kémo
 Lobaye
 Logon River
 Mambéré-Kadéï
 Manovo-Gounda St. Floris National Park
 Mbaïki
 Mbomou
 Mbomou River
 Mobaye
 Mongoumba
 N'Délé
 Nana-Grébizi
 Nana-Mambéré
 Nola, Central African Republic
 Obo
 Ombella-M'Poko
 Ouadda
 Ouaka
 Ouango
 Oubangui-Chari
 Ouham
 Ouham River
 Ouham-Pendé
 Paoua
 Rafaï
 Sangha River
 Sangha-Mbaéré
 Sibut
 Template:CentralAfricanRepublic-geo-stub
 Tondou Massif
 Ubangi River
 Vakaga
 Zinga

Government of the Central African Republic
 Foreign relations of the Central African Republic
 Heads of government of the Central African Republic (and Central African Empire)
 Heads of state of the Central African Republic (and Central African Empire)
 Military of the Central African Republic
 National Assembly of the Central African Republic

History of the Central African Republic
 History of the Central African Republic
 Central African Empire
 Colonial heads of Central Africa
 French Congo
 French Equatorial Africa
 Heads of government of the Central African Republic (and Central African Empire)
 Oubangui-Chari

Elections in the Central African Republic
 Elections in the Central African Republic
 2005 Central African Republic elections

Law of the Central African Republic
 Gay rights in the Central African Republic

Central African people

Central African politicians
 Bernard Ayandho
 Barthélemy Boganda
 Jean-Bédel Bokassa
 Simon Narcisse Bozanga
 François Bozizé
 David Dacko
 Anicet Georges Dologuélé
 Elisabeth Domitien
 Élie Doté
 Edouard Frank
 Célestin Gaombalet
 Michel Gbezera-Bria
 Abel Goumba
 André Kolingba
 Gabriel Koyambounou
 Enoch Derant Lakoué
 Jean-Pierre Lebouder
 Henri Maïdou
 Timothée Malendoma
 Jean-Luc Mandaba
 Charles Massi
 Jean-Paul Ngoupandé
 Ange-Félix Patassé
 Martin Ziguélé
 Template:CAR Presidents

Central African sportspeople

 Elvis Bomayako
 Romain Sato

Politics of the Central African Republic

 Politics of the Central African Republic
 Foreign relations of the Central African Republic
 National Assembly of the Central African Republic

Political parties in the Central African Republic
 List of political parties in the Central African Republic
 Alliance for Democracy and Progress
 Central African Democratic Rally
 Central African Democratic Union
 Central African National Liberation Movement
 Democratic Evolution Movement of Central Africa
 Democratic Forum for Modernity
 Independent Grouping for Reflection
 Löndö Association
 MESAN
 Movement for Democracy and Independence
 Movement for the Liberation of the Central African People
 National Convergence "Kwa Na Kwa"
 National Unity Party (Central African Republic)
 Patriotic Front for Progress
 Republican Progressive Party
 Social Democratic Party (Central African Republic)

Religion in Central African Republic
 Islam in the Central African Republic
 Roman Catholicism in the Central African Republic

Central African society

 Demographics of the Central African Republic
 Fédération du scoutisme centrafricain
 Public holidays in the Central African Republic

Ethnic groups in the Central African Republic
 Baggara
 Baka (Cameroon and Gabon)
 Banda people
 Baya
 Mandja people
 Sara people
 Wodaabe

African Pygmies
 Aka people
 Baka people (Cameroon and Gabon)
 Ota Benga
 Efé people
 Pygmy
 Pygmy music
 Twa peoples

Pygmy mythology
 Bambuti mythology
 Khonvoum

Transport in the Central African Republic

 Transport in the Central African Republic

Central African Republic stubs

 Aja language (Nilo-Saharan)
 Alliance for Democracy and Progress
 Anicet Georges Dologuélé
 Barthelemy Boganda Stadium
 Barthélemy Boganda
 Baya
 Bernard Ayandho
 Central African Democratic Rally
 Central African Democratic Union
 Central African Empire
 Central African Football Federation
 Central African National Liberation Movement
 Central African Republic at the 1992 Summer Olympics
 Central African Republic at the 1996 Summer Olympics
 Central African Republic national football team
 Charles Massi
 Coat of arms of the Central African Republic
 Communications in the Central African Republic
 Confédération Syndicale des Travailleurs de Centrafrique
 Célestin Gaombalet
 Democratic Evolution Movement of Central Africa
 Democratic Forum for Modernity
 Edouard Frank
 Elections in the Central African Republic
 Elisabeth Domitien
 Enoch Derant Lakoué
 Fer language
 Flag of the Central African Republic
 French Equatorial Africa
 Fédération des Eclaireurs Scouts Centrafricains
 Gabriel Koyambounou
 Henri Maïdou
 Independent Grouping for Reflection
 Islam in the Central African Republic
 Jean-Luc Mandaba
 Jean-Pierre Lebouder
 LGBT rights in the Central African Republic (Gay rights)
 Löndö Association
 Mandja people
 Martin Ziguélé
 Michel Gbezera-Bria
 Movement for Democracy and Independence
 Movement for the Liberation of the Central African People
 National Confederation of Central African Workers
 National Convergence "Kwa Na Kwa"
 National Unity Party (Central African Republic)
 Patriotic Front for Progress
 People's Army for the Restoration of the Republic and Democracy
 Public holidays in the Central African Republic
 Republican Progressive Party
 Romain Sato
 Roman Catholicism in the Central African Republic
 Simon Narcisse Bozanga
 Social Democratic Party (Central African Republic)
 Sub-prefectures of the Central African Republic
 Template:CentralAfricanRepublic-stub
 Timothée Malendoma
 Transport in the Central African Republic
 Union of Central African Workers
 University of Bangui
 Élie Doté

See also
 Outline of the Central African Republic
 Lists of country-related topics - similar lists for other countries